Jorge Gaday (born 19 February 1968) is an Argentine former cyclist. He competed in the team pursuit event at the 1988 Summer Olympics.

References

External links
 

1968 births
Living people
Argentine male cyclists
Olympic cyclists of Argentina
Cyclists at the 1988 Summer Olympics
Place of birth missing (living people)
20th-century Argentine people